Loony on the Bus is the fifteenth studio album by Roy Harper and was released in 1988 when Harper required cash in order to start his own company. These demos finally served their purpose by funding Harper's 1990 album Once.

History
The album is mostly a collection of demos and tracks originally intended for release in 1978-9 under the title Commercial Breaks. The original release was held back because of disputes between Harper and EMI over funding and content and resultantly, it was not until the release of Loony on the Bus in 1988 that most of the tracks became publicly available.

Seven songs are taken from the original track listing for Commercial Breaks (tracks: 1,2,3,6,9,10,& 11), two songs still remain exclusive to this release (tracks 5 & 8), and two tracks (4 & 7) though exclusive at the time of release, would later be released as bonus tracks on the eventual 1994 CD release of Commercial Breaks.

The album's title was inspired by a review of one of Harper's earlier albums in a women's magazine. The reviewer stated that  Harper reminded her of "...the loony on the bus".

Track listing
All tracks credited to Roy Harper

"No Change (Ten Years Ago)" – (3:21) (from Commercial Breaks) 
"Sail Away" – (4:47) (from Commercial Breaks)
"I Wanna Be Part Of The News" – (3:34) (from Commercial Breaks)
"Burn The World (Part 1)" – (5:04)
"Casualty" – (3:55) (exclusive to this release)
"Cora" – (3:23) (from Commercial Breaks)
"Playing Prisons" – (4:11)
"Loony On The Bus" – (3:49) (exclusive to this release)
"Come Up And See Me" – (4:21) (from Commercial Breaks) 
"The Flycatcher" – (3:55) (from Commercial Breaks)
"Square Boxes" – (4:01) (from Commercial Breaks)

Personnel
Roy Harper – guitar and vocals
John Leckie – sound engineer
Dave Cochran
John Halsey – guitar
David Lawson – keyboards
Henry McCullough
Andy Roberts

References

External links 
Roy Harper Official Site
Excellent Roy Harper resource
Roy Harper Biography and Discography

Roy Harper (singer) albums
1988 albums